Child Support is an American game show series, hosted by Fred Savage and starring Ricky Gervais. It premiered on January 5, 2018 on ABC. In its 2016 early development stage, the show was originally called Five to Survive. On March 13, 2018, ABC renewed the series for a second season. Later that year, the show did not return for the third season and was cancelled.

Gameplay
A question is asked to an onstage contestant by Savage, and to a group of five children in a backstage room by Gervais. A correct answer by the contestant increases his/her winnings by one level (see below), but if he/she gives an incorrect answer, footage of the children's responses is played back to the studio. If any of the children answer correctly, the contestant remains in the game but wins no money for the question; in addition, the highest remaining prize level is removed from play. The potential top prize is $200,000, which the contestant can only achieve by answering 10 consecutive questions correctly.

The game ends as soon as any of the following occurs:

A total of 10 questions have been played.

If the last question is answered correctly, the contestant keeps his/her entire winnings.

If the contestant misses the question and the children answer correctly, he/she keeps the money for his/her last correct answer.

The contestant chooses to stop after either the fourth or eighth question, keeping all money won to that point.
Both the contestant and the children fail to answer the same question correctly.

In the first season, he/she left with nothing.
In the second season, the contestant receives $500 for each correct answer given by the children to that point.
The children's responses are frequently played back for comic effect even when the contestant gives a correct answer. No contestant ever won the top prize.

Episodes

Season 1 (2018)

Season 2 (2018)

References

External links
 
 

2010s American game shows
2018 American television series debuts
2018 American television series endings
American Broadcasting Company original programming
English-language television shows
Television series about children
Television series by Banijay